Jay Shih (born 31 October 1983) is a Taiwanese actor, singer and television host. He debuted as one half of the Mandopop duo Awaking, with the other being Wesley Chia. As an actor, he has appeared in television series including Miss No Good (2008), Summer Fever (2012) and Love Cheque Charge (2014), and is best known for portraying Cheng Jen-wei in the SET series In a Good Way (2013).

Filmography

Television series

Film

Variety show

Discography

Singles

Compilation album

Published works

Awards and nominations

References

External links
 
 
 

1983 births
Living people
Taiwanese male television actors
Taiwanese male film actors
21st-century Taiwanese male actors
Male actors from New Taipei
21st-century Taiwanese male singers
Taiwanese television presenters
Musicians from New Taipei